Lake Land College is a public community college in Mattoon, Illinois. It was founded in 1966. As of the Fall 2021 semester Lake Land serves 3,644 students, mainly from the east-central Illinois region. The  campus has seven major buildings plus eight supportive buildings, two campus ponds, and a  agriculture land laboratory.

History
Lake Land's creation was first approved in 1966 by a referendum in 13 public school districts centered on Mattoon.  The first classes were held the following year in various buildings throughout the town.  The first president of the college was Virgil H. Judge (who was the father of Darrell L. Judge).  Construction on the college began in 1971 and continued in phases throughout the 1970s.

Academic programs at Lake Land College include Agriculture; Allied Health; Business; Humanities; Math & Science; Technology and Social Science & Education.  Other coursework programs include the Cisco Networking Academy, Computer Troubleshooting, Physical Therapist Assistant, Desktop Publishing Graphic Design, Radio-TV Broadcasting, Raster Geographic Information Systems, and Psychiatric Rehabilitation. Lake Land College also recently started an ROTC program. Over 150 courses are offered online.

Athletics
Lake Land College sponsors teams in two men's and three women's NJCAA sanctioned sports:

The Lakers have won one NJCAA National Championship which happened in 2021. The women's basketball team finished 24–2 and defeated Johnson County Community College 53–49 to win their first national championship. The Lakers have had several trips to the NJCAA National Tournament. The Lakers are known for making runs within the Great Rivers Athletic Conference (GRAC), and Region 24 Tournaments. The most successful programs at Lake Land are softball and women's basketball, particularly for their high number of NJCAA National Tournament Appearances.

The majority of Lake Land Athletics are played at Laker Fieldhouse. Laker Fieldhouse plays host to Women's Basketball, Men's Basketball, and Women's Volleyball matches. Lake Land has other facilities used for baseball and softball matches, which are officially named Laker Baseball Field and Laker Softball Field.

Notable alumni

Athletes
Gary Gaetti, retired MLB All-Star third baseman
Rex Morgan, former NBA player for the Boston Celtics
Victor Snipes, NCAA season steals leader in 1992

Politics
Darren Bailey, member of the Illinois House of Representatives
Brad Halbrook, member of the Illinois House of Representatives

References

External links 
 

Community colleges in Illinois
Education in Coles County, Illinois
Buildings and structures in Coles County, Illinois
NJCAA athletics